Dražen Madunović (born 17 March 1971) is a retired Croatian football defender.

Managerial career
He took charge at NK Zagreb in November 2011, succeeding Luka Bonačić who had replaced Dražen Besek himself earlier in the season.

References

External links
 

1971 births
Living people
Association football defenders
Croatian footballers
NK Varaždin players
GNK Dinamo Zagreb players
Hapoel Be'er Sheva F.C. players
Croatian Football League players
Israeli Premier League players
Croatian expatriate footballers
Expatriate footballers in Israel
Croatian expatriate sportspeople in Israel
Croatian football managers
NK Zagreb managers